NGC 996 is an elliptical galaxy of the Hubble type E0 in the constellation Andromeda. It is estimated to be 210 million light years from the Milky Way and has a diameter of approximately 75,000 ly. The supernova SN 1996bq occurred in this galaxy. NGC 996 was discovered on December 7, 1871 by astronomer Édouard Stephan.

See also 
 List of NGC objects (1–1000)

References 

Elliptical galaxies
Andromeda (constellation)
0996
010015